The Giro dell'Emilia Internazionale Donne Elite is a women's staged cycle race which takes place in Italy and is currently rated by the UCI as category 1.Pro. It's the women's race of the Giro dell'Emilia.

Overall winners

References 

Women's cycle races
Cycle races in Italy